Björn Petter Bragée (born 10 September 1968) is a Swedish film director, film producer and screenwriter, well known as director for the Vintergatan series. He has also produced among the TV series Landgång.

Bragée received Ollénpriset ("The Ollén Award") in 2005.

References

External links
 

Swedish film directors
Swedish screenwriters
Swedish male screenwriters
Swedish film producers
Living people
1968 births